The Bush Street Temple at 1881 Bush Street in San Francisco, California, is a State Landmark with historical significance to both the Orthodox Jewish community and to Buddhism in the United States.

Building
The building was built in 1895 in a Moorish Revival-Venetian style designed by Moses J. Lyon.  The arches across the front are copied from the Doge's Palace.  It was extensively renovated in 2003, at which time it was joined to a new adjacent structure.

The building is constructed almost entirely of redwood.   Originally, much of the interior was painted in trompe-l'œil to resemble marble. In its original configuration it featured a pair of elaborate towers, since lost.

History

Congregation Ohabai Shalome

In 1864, a group of disaffected members of San Francisco’s Congregation Emanu-El broke away and established Congregation Ohabai Shalome  (Heb.: Lovers of Peace,) when they objected to the modification of the ritual in the older synagogue. It was popularly known as the Bush Street Synagogue. In the face of declining membership, the congregation sold the building in November 1934 to the Soto Zen Mission of the Sokoji Buddhist Church.

San Francisco Go Club

The San Francisco Go Club had become the first overseas branch of Japan's Nihon Ki-in in 1936 and in 1937 moved into the left wing of the building. The club remained, even after the building was otherwise abandoned, until forced out by redevelopment about 1994.

Sokoji Soto Zen Mission

During World War II, the owners and Japanese-American congregants of the Soto Zen Mission of the Sokoji Buddhist Church were interned in concentration camps, as part of the wartime s Japanese American internment. During this time, while its Japanese-American owners continued to make mortgage payments on the building, 1881 Bush Street became the home of the Macedonia Missionary Baptist Church, a church whose congregants were primarily African-Americans from the American South. After the war, the Zen Mission took back ownership of the building.

In 1959 Shunryu Suzuki Roshi arrived at Sokoji to minister to the congregation. He initiated the regular practice of zazen, which was unusual at the time and soon began to attract western students. The San Francisco Zen Center was incorporated separately, comprising the western disciples of Suzuki Roshi, who continued to share the space throughout the 1960s with the Sokoji congregation. During this time the building was one of the central locations of the transmission of Zen Buddhism to the United States. In 1969 the Zen Center, in need of larger facilities, moved to Page Street. The Sokoji community also moved three years later in 1972, and the building thereafter stood empty and fell into disrepair, coming under the ownership of the San Francisco Redevelopment Agency.

Abandonment and Redevelopment

In the late 1980s, there were unsuccessful attempts to turn the building into a Jewish Cultural Center. Finally, in 1996, the ownership of the building was transferred to the Japanese American Religious Federation and it ultimately was given to Kokoro Assisted Living, a home for senior citizens, most of whom are from the Japanese-American community. Kokoro opened in 2003.

See also
List of San Francisco Designated Landmarks
San Francisco

References

External links
News feature on renovation
Kokoro Senior Citizen Assisted Living Center
Description with picture of the facade

Synagogues in San Francisco
San Francisco Zen Center
Buddhism in San Francisco
San Francisco Designated Landmarks
Religious organizations established in 1864
1864 establishments in California
Moorish Revival synagogues
Moorish Revival architecture in California